Caladenia saxatilis is a plant in the orchid family Orchidaceae and is endemic to South Australia. It is a ground orchid with a single hairy leaf and one or two pale creamy-green flowers, sometimes with thin reddish lines. It occurs in the southern Flinders Ranges.

Description
The tip of the labellum curls downward and there are four or six rows of dark red, mostly stalked calli along the mid-line of the labellum. Flowering occurs in August and September.

Taxonomy and naming
Caladenia saxatilis was first formally described in 2006 by David Jones, who gave it the name Arachnorchis saxatilis and published the description in Australian Orchid Research from a specimen collected on the eastern side of the Mount Remarkable National Park. In 2010, Robert Bates changed the name to Caladenia saxatilis. The specific epithet (saxatilis) is a Latin word meaning "among rocks", referring to the rocky habitat where this species usually grows.

Distribution and habitat
This spider orchid occurs in the Flinders Ranges, Northern Lofty, Murray and Yorke Peninsula botanical regions of South Australia where it grows among rocks in tall forest.

References

saxatilis
Plants described in 2006
Endemic orchids of Australia
Orchids of South Australia
Taxa named by David L. Jones (botanist)
Taxa named by Robert John Bates